Jimmy Dan Conner (born March 20, 1953 in Lawrenceburg, Kentucky) is a retired professional basketball shooting guard who played one season in the American Basketball Association (ABA) as a member of the Kentucky Colonels. As a high school senior in 1971, he was named Kentucky Mr. Basketball as a member of the Anderson County High School men's basketball team. He attended University of Kentucky where he was a member of the school's basketball team. He was selected in the 1975 NBA draft by the Phoenix Suns in the second round (18 pick overall), but did not sign.

External links

1953 births
Living people
American men's basketball players
Basketball players from Kentucky
Kentucky Colonels players
Kentucky Wildcats men's basketball players
Parade High School All-Americans (boys' basketball)
People from Lawrenceburg, Kentucky
Phoenix Suns draft picks
Shooting guards